Komi Zje (Ԅ ԅ; italics: Ԅ ԅ) is a letter of the Molodtsov alphabet, a version of Cyrillic. It was used only in the writing of the Komi language.

Computing codes

References

See also 
 З́ з́ : Cyrillic letter Zje
 З з : Cyrillic letter Ze
 Cyrillic characters in Unicode

Komi language
Permic languages
Cyrillic letters